Ángel Luis Ruiz Paz (born 12 January 1987 in La Puebla de Montalbán, Province of Toledo), known as Candela, is a Spanish professional footballer who plays for Club Atlético Ibañés as a defensive midfielder.

References

External links

1987 births
Living people
Sportspeople from the Province of Toledo
Spanish footballers
Footballers from Castilla–La Mancha
Association football midfielders
Segunda División players
Segunda División B players
Tercera División players
Atlético Albacete players
Albacete Balompié players
Celta de Vigo B players
RC Celta de Vigo players
Pontevedra CF footballers
Barakaldo CF footballers
La Roda CF players
2. Liga (Austria) players
SV Horn players
First Vienna FC players
New Radiant S.C. players
Spanish expatriate footballers
Expatriate footballers in Austria
Expatriate footballers in the Maldives
Spanish expatriate sportspeople in Austria